Aspergillus umbrosus (also named A. glaucus) is a species of fungus in the genus Aspergillus. It is from the Aspergillus section. The species was first described in 1912. It has been reported to produce asperflavin, auroglaucin, bisanthrons, dihydroauroglaucin, echinulins, emodin, epiheveadrides, erythroglaucin, flavoglaucin, isoechinulins, neoechinulins, physcion, questin, questinol, tetracyclic, and tetrahydroauroglaucin.

References 

umbrosus
Fungi described in 1912